Abderrahmane Benguerrah (عبد الرحمن بن قراح )is an Algerian diplomat. He is currently serving as ambassador of the People's Democratic Republic of Algeria to India, Nepal  Sri Lanka and the Maldives. He previously served as Ambassador to The United Kingdom of Great Britain and Northern Ireland and as Permanent Representative of Algeria to the International Maritime organisation.

Education 
Benguerrah went to the University of New Hampshire, receiving a Bachelor of Science in Engineering, and a Bachelor of Arts in Economics and a Master of Arts in Economics from the same university.

Personal life 
Abderrahmane Benguerrah was born, November 8, 1955, in Ain Bessem, W. Bouira, Algeria. He is married to Fatiha Benguerrah and has three children

References 

Ambassadors of Algeria to the United Kingdom
Permanent Representatives of Algeria to the United Nations
Year of birth missing (living people)
Living people
21st-century Algerian people